Gideon and Samson: Great Leaders of the Bible (or I grandi condottieri) is a 1965 Italian historical film directed by Marcello Baldi and Francisco Pérez-Dolz.  Consisting of two segments, the first half tells the story of Gideon, while the second the story of Samson.

Plot

Israelites are faulted for worshipping Baal instead of Jehovah. Jehovah is said to have abandoned the Israelites for worshiping false gods instead of Jehovah himself. Gideon chooses an army of 300 (Judges 7:8) to wage war against the Midianites. Gideon delivers Israelites from the hands of Midianite raiders. Gideon captures the kings of Midian Zebah and Zalmunna (Judges 8:10). After Gideon's son Jeter shies away from decapitating the two Midianite kings, Gideon slays the kings personally (Judges 8:21).

Cast

Anton Geesink	as 	Samson
Rosalba Neri	as 	Delilah
Ivo Garrani	as 	Gideon
Maruchi Fresno	as 	Gideon's wife
Fernando Rey	as 	The stranger
Giorgio Cerioni	as	Gideon's son
Luz Márquez	as 	Gaza
Ana María Noé	as 	Samson's mother 
Mirko Ellis
Piero Gerlini
Paolo Gozlino as the Prince of Gaza
José Jaspe

References

External links
 

1965 films
1960s Italian-language films
Sword and sandal films
Films about Samson
Judges of ancient Israel
Films directed by Marcello Baldi
Films shot in Almería
Peplum films
1960s Italian films